RTU FC or RTU Futbola centrs is a Latvian football club, affiliated with the Riga Technical University. They are based in the capital city of Riga and compete in the second highest division of Latvian football (the Latvian First League) and the Latvian Football Cup. From 2017 to 2018 the team partnered with the remnants of the now defunct Skonto FC, playing as RTU FC/Skonto Academy, after Skonto failed to receive the First League licence from LFF in 2016.

The club did not apply for the 2019 Latvian First League season, possibly due to financial issues.

Players

First-team squad
As of 12 June 2016.

References

External links 

Official website (archived)
Facebook page

Football clubs in Latvia
Association football clubs established in 2011
2011 establishments in Latvia